These are the results of the men's singles competition, one of two events for male competitors in table tennis at the 2000 Summer Olympics in Sydney.

Among 64 entries, 16 seeded players were allocated into the draw of knockout stage which started from the round of 32. The rest competed in  groups of three players per group. Winners of each group advanced to the knockout stage.

Seeds

  (champion, gold medalist)
  (quarterfinals)
  (semifinals, bronze medalist)
  (second round)
  (Final, silver medalist)
  (quarterfinals)
  (semifinals, fourth place)
  (first round)
  (first round)
  (quarterfinals)
  (second round)
  (first round)
  (first round)
  (second round)
  (second round)
  (second round)

Group stage

Group A

Group B

Group C

Group D

Group E

Group F

Group G

Group H

Group I

Group J

Group K

Group L

Group M

Group N

Group O

Group P

Knockout stage

Finals

Top half

Bottom half

Competitors

References

External links
 Table Tennis. Official Report of the XXVII Olympiad - Results. Digitally published by the LA84 Foundation.
 2000 Summer Olympics / Table Tennis / Singles, Men. Olympedia.

Table tennis at the 2000 Summer Olympics
Men's events at the 2000 Summer Olympics